Winter's Bone is a 2010 independent American drama film directed by Debra Granik. Adapted by Granik and Anne Rosellini from the 2006 novel of the same name by author Daniel Woodrell, the movie was released by Roadside Attractions in the United States and Canada on June 11, 2010. It grossed over US$84,000 in its opening weekend on limited release. Since then it has grossed over US$6,500,000 domestically and US$12,460,000 worldwide. Winter's Bone was well received by movie critics, with an approval rating of 94 percent on the review aggregator Rotten Tomatoes. The film appeared in more than two dozen movie reviewers' Top Ten lists for the best movies of the year.

The film has received honors in different categories, ranging from recognition of the movie itself, to its direction, cinematography and writing, as well as for performances by the cast, mainly Jennifer Lawrence for Best Actress and John Hawkes for Best Supporting Actor. Lawrence's breakthrough role as Ree Dolly in this movie also earned her several Best Breakthrough Performance awards. At the 68th Golden Globe Awards ceremony, Winter's Bone earned one nomination for Best Actress in a Motion Picture – Drama. It received four nominations—including Best Actress—at the 83rd Academy Awards, but failed to win any accolades. Lawrence, at 20, was the second-youngest person ever nominated for Best Actress by the academy at that time. The movie fared better at the 26th Independent Spirit Awards, where it received seven nominations and won awards for Best Supporting Female and Best Supporting Male. Both the principal actors earned a nomination at the 17th Screen Actors Guild Awards.

Prior to its June theatrical release, Winter's Bone was screened at film festivals, where it received other prizes. The movie was nominated for and won two Golden Space Needle Awards at the Seattle International Film Festival. Its debut at the 2010 Sundance Film Festival earned the movie the two accolades for which it was nominated, one being the Grand Jury Prize for a dramatic film. Winter's Bone was included in the Top Ten Best Films of 2010 categories by the American Film Institute and National Board of Review Awards, among others. At the Detroit Film Critics Society Awards, and Gotham Independent Film Awards, the cast of Winter's Bone was nominated for Best Ensemble. In total, the film has won 29 awards from 76 nominations.

Awards and nominations

See also
 List of oldest and youngest Academy Award winners and nominees – Youngest nominees for Best Actress in a Leading Role
 List of awards and nominations received by Jennifer Lawrence

References
General

Specific

External links
 

Lists of accolades by film